OC Weekly was a free alternative weekly paper distributed in Orange County and Long Beach, California. OC Weekly was founded in September 1995 by Will Swaim, who acted as editor and publisher until 2007.

The paper was distributed at coffee shops, bookstores, clothing stores, convenience stores, and street boxes. OC Weekly printed art and entertainment listings for both Orange and Los Angeles counties. , it had a total circulation of 45,000 papers with an estimated readership of 225,000.

On November 27, 2019, Duncan McIntosh Co. announced the immediate shutdown of the publication.

Content
The weekly highlighted content that critiqued local politics, personalities and culture and has been described as "what some people might politely call an edgy brand of journalism." Popular features included: the syndicated column "¡Ask a Mexican!", in which Arellano responded to reader questions about Latino stereotypes in an amusing politically incorrect manner;  an award-winning news blog called Navel Gazing; a food blog called "Stick a Fork in It"; and the award-winning investigative work of R. Scott Moxley, Nick Schou and Matt Coker.

Ownership
Duncan McIntosh Co., Fountain Valley, California, owned the publication along with Sea Magazine, BoatingWorld, The Log, and Editor & Publisher. The previous owner was Voice Media Group and was a sister publication of the LA Weekly and The Village Voice. In January 2015, Voice Media Group offered the OC Weekly for sale. Duncan McIntosh purchased the paper in 2016. On November 27, 2019, Duncan McIntosh Co. announced the immediate shut down of the publication.

Awards and reputation
For his newspaper work, the publisher Gustavo Arellano received a 2014 Distinguished Journalist Award from the Greater Los Angeles chapter of the Society of Professional Journalists and the 2008 Spirit Award from the California Latino Legislative Caucus as well as awards from the Association of Alternative Newsweeklies, the Los Angeles Press Club and the National Hispanic Media Coalition.

The OC Weekly's articles frequently targeted conservative politicians and hypocrisies within the local establishment. Exposés have led to felony indictments against two consecutive Huntington Beach mayors.

References

External links
 OC Weekly.com
 Navel Gazing, OC Weekly's nigh-world-famous staff blog
 Stick A Fork In It, The Weekly's food blog
 Heard Mentality, The Weekly's music blog

Alternative weekly newspapers published in the United States
Mass media in Orange County, California
Newspapers published in Greater Los Angeles
Publications established in 1995
1995 establishments in California
Weekly newspapers published in California